Smilyan Bastion (‘Smilyanski Rid’ \'smi-lyan-ski 'rid\) is the rounded ice-covered buttress extending 13 km in southeast-northwest direction and 16 km in south-southwest to north-northeast direction, and rising to 1525 m on the west side of Hemimont Plateau on Loubet Coast in Graham Land, Antarctica. The feature has steep and partly ice-free south, west and north slopes, and surmounts Barnes Glacier to the south, Blind Bay to the southwest, Forel Glacier and Sharp Glacier to the west, and Klebelsberg Glacier to the northeast.

The buttress is named after the settlement of Smilyan in Southern Bulgaria.

Location
British mapping in 1978.

Maps
Antarctic Digital Database (ADD). Scale 1:250000 topographic map of Antarctica. Scientific Committee on Antarctic Research (SCAR). Since 1993, regularly upgraded and updated.
British Antarctic Territory. Scale 1:200000 topographic map. DOS 610 Series, Sheet W 67 66. Directorate of Overseas Surveys, Tolworth, UK, 1978.

Notes

References
 Bulgarian Antarctic Gazetteer. Antarctic Place-names Commission. (details in Bulgarian, basic data in English)
 Smilyan Bastion. SCAR Composite Antarctic Gazetteer

External links
 Smilyan Bastion. Copernix satellite image

Mountains of Graham Land
Bulgaria and the Antarctic
Loubet Coast